Urinary calcium is calcium in the urine. It is termed -calcuria or -calciuria as a suffix.

Normal amount
In a urinalysis, the normal amount of urinary calcium can be measured in amount per time (commonly per 24 hours). It can also be measured in amount per mass of creatinine, which avails for estimating the urinary calcium excretion in a spot urine sample, because urinary creatinine clearance is relatively unaffected by differences in free water clearance which occurs, for example, in dehydration and which would distort the interpretation of the urinary calcium in a spot urine sample.

Normally, in an average adult, the amount of calcium excreted in the urine is 100–250 mg over a 24-hour period. For those on low-calcium diets, there is normally 50–150 mg/24 hours, while those on a calcium-free diet will have 5–40 mg/24 hours.

The following reference ranges are for persons with average calcium intake (600–800 mg/day for adults):

Disorders
An abnormally high amount of urinary calcium is called hypercalciuria and an abnormally low amount is called hypocalcuria.

References

Urine tests